Sir Thomas Metham (died 1573 in York Castle) was an English Roman Catholic knight, imprisoned with his second wife for their beliefs.

Life
Metham was the eldest son of Thomas Metham, of Metham, Yorkshire, by his marriage to Grace, a daughter of Thomas Pudsey, of Barford and Bolton. He married twice: first to Dorothy, daughter of George, Baron Darcy of Aston, and then to Edith, daughter of Nicholas Palmes of Naburn. Metham was knighted on 2 October 1553, the day after the coronation of Queen Mary I. Through George, his second son by his first wife, he was the grandfather of Father Thomas Metham, S.J., one of the Dilati, who died in 1592.

By 16 August 1565, Sir Thomas and his second wife had been imprisoned "for contempt of Her Majesty's ordinances concerning the administration of divine service and the sacraments".

On 6 February 1569–70 an unknown correspondent wrote to Sir William Cecil from York:

Metham died in York Castle in 1573. Some years later, in 1587, his widow was still a recusant.

References

1573 deaths
English Roman Catholics
History of Catholicism in England
People from Howden
Year of birth unknown
16th-century Roman Catholics
16th-century English people
English knights